Mariano Sebastián Trípodi (born 3 July 1987) is an Argentine footballer who plays for Metropolitano as a striker.

Club career
Born in Buenos Aires, Trípodi started his career playing for the famous Boca Juniors academy which has a habit of producing star players. Clubs from across the continent started to become aware of Tripodi's goalscoring for the Boca Juniors U18s team, scoring 31 times in his first season. He was then quickly taken on by Köln, of Germany, where he played one match, against Duisburg, in which he scored his only goal for the club, and then was demoted to Köln II. He then returned to Argentina, where he joined San Martín de San Juan, playing four matches for the club.

On February 7, 2008, he was signed by Santos of Brazil, and on February 21, 2008, Trípodi played his first match as a Santos player when his club beat Guarani 3–1. On August 22, 2008, he was loaned by Santos to Vitória, and on August 30, 2008, he played his first match as a Vitória player, when his club and Ipatinga drew 0-0. Trípodi joined Atlético Mineiro on March 5, 2009. Tripodi is regularly scouted and it was no surprise that it was announced that he had agreed to a ten-day trial at Leeds United on August 5, 2009, arriving in England on August 6, 2009. He played and scored the opening goal on August 12, 2009, in a behind closed doors game against a Newcastle United XI, which Leeds won 5–1. After a half year with Clube Atlético Metropolitano in Brazil, he returned in June 2010 to Argentina and signed a one-year contract for Arsenal de Sarandí.

References

External links
 Argentine Primera statistics at Fútbol XXI  
 
 

1987 births
Living people
Footballers from Buenos Aires
Argentine footballers
Argentine expatriate footballers
Association football forwards
Argentine Primera División players
Boca Juniors footballers
San Martín de San Juan footballers
Arsenal de Sarandí footballers
1. FC Köln players
Campeonato Brasileiro Série A players
Santos FC players
Esporte Clube Vitória players
Clube Atlético Mineiro players
Clube Atlético Metropolitano players
Sociedade Esportiva e Recreativa Caxias do Sul players
Rio Branco Sport Club players
Joinville Esporte Clube players
Unión San Felipe footballers
Primera B de Chile players
J2 League players
Tochigi SC players
Argentine expatriate sportspeople in Germany
Argentine expatriate sportspeople in Brazil
Argentine expatriate sportspeople in Chile
Argentine expatriate sportspeople in Japan
Expatriate footballers in Chile
Expatriate footballers in Germany
Expatriate footballers in Brazil
Expatriate footballers in Japan